Tetrafluoroethylene (TFE) is a fluorocarbon with the chemical formula C2F4. It is the simplest perfluorinated alkene. This gaseous species is used primarily in the industrial preparation of fluoropolymers.

Properties
Tetrafluoroethylene is a colorless, odorless gas. Like all unsaturated fluorocarbons, it is susceptible to nucleophilic attack. It is unstable towards decomposition to carbon and carbon tetrafluoride and prone to form explosive peroxides in contact with air.

Industrial use
Polymerization of tetrafluoroethylene produces polytetrafluoroethylene (PTFE) polymers such as Teflon and Fluon. PTFE is one of the two fluorocarbon resins composed wholly of fluorine and carbon. The other resin composed purely of carbon and fluorine is the copolymer of TFE with typically 6–9% hexafluoropropene (HFP), which is known as FEP (fluorinated ethylene propylene copolymer). TFE is also used in the preparation of numerous copolymers that also include hydrogen and/or oxygen, including both fluoroplastics and fluoroelastomers. Typical TFE-based fluoroplastics include ETFE, the alternating 1:1 copolymer with ethylene, and PFA, which is a random copolymer similar to FEP but with a minor amount of a perfluoroalkyl vinyl ether (PAVE) rather than HFP. DuPont uses primarily perfluoro(methylvinylether), whereas Daikin uses primarily perfluoro(propylvinylether) in manufacturing PFA. There are numerous other fluoropolymers that contain tetrafluoroethylene, but usually not at greater than 50% by weight.

Manufacture
TFE is manufactured from chloroform. Chloroform is fluorinated by reaction with hydrogen fluoride to produce chlorodifluoromethane (R-22). Pyrolysis of chlorodifluoromethane (at 550–750 °C) yields TFE, with difluorocarbene as an intermediate.
CHCl3 + 2 HF → CHClF2 + 2 HCl
2 CHClF2 → C2F4 + 2 HCl

Alternatively, it can be prepared by pyrolysis of fluoroform:
2 CHF3 → C2F4 + 2 HF

Laboratory methods
A convenient, safe method for generated TFE is the pyrolysis of the sodium salt of pentafluoropropionic acid:
C2F5CO2Na  →   C2F4  +  CO2  +  NaF 
The  process is however challenging because attention must be paid to pressure, as well as the avoidance of perfluoroisobutylene. PTFE polymer cracks, and at a pressure below  exclusively C2F4 is obtained. At higher pressures the product mixture contains hexafluoropropylene and octafluorocyclobutane.

Reactions
Tetrafluoroethylene is a reactive molecule that participates in myriad reactions.  Owing to the presence of four fluorine substituents, its reactions differ strongly from the behavior of conventional alkenes such as ethylene.  Tetrafluoroethylene dimerizes, giving octafluorocyclobutane. Even normal alkenes and dienes add tetrafluoroethylene in a [2+2] manner.  1,3-Butadiene gives 3-vinyl-1,1,2,2-tetrafluorocyclobutane.

Safety
The main hazard associated with TFE is that of explosion, especially if oxygen is present. TFE reacts with oxygen at low temperatures to form an explosive oxide, the detonation of which is usually sufficient to trigger explosive decomposition of TFE to C and CF4. Explosions can also be caused by adiabatic compression if the TFE is handled under high pressure, which it typically is in an industrial setting. If pressurised TFE is allowed into a vessel or pipework at a lower pressure, then the atmosphere in the vessel will be compressed by the TFE, causing it to heat up, potentially to the point where it might detonate the TFE. This has been known to cause explosions. In industry, pipework is flushed with pressurized nitrogen, before the introduction of TFE, both to exclude oxygen and prevent adiabatic compression.

TFE is an alkylating agent, albeit a weak one, and as such is expected to be a carcinogen. LD50(rat, inhalation) = 40000 ppm.

Health effects
The International Agency for Research on Cancer classifies TFE as probably carcinogenic to humans based on animal studies.

See also
Tetrachloroethylene
1,1,1,2-Tetrafluoroethane
Fluorochemical industry

References

External links
National Toxicology Program Chemical Repository
Tetrafluoroethylene, hexafluoropropylene and vinylidene fluoride terpolymer – aka THV, melt-processable members of the fluorocarbon family
 

Organofluorides
Monomers
IARC Group 2A carcinogens
Organic compounds with 2 carbon atoms
Alkene derivatives